Marcello Osler (born 18 August 1945) is an Italian former professional racing cyclist. He rode in the 1976 Tour de France.

References

External links
 

1945 births
Living people
Italian male cyclists
Sportspeople from Trentino
Cyclists from Trentino-Alto Adige/Südtirol